

Buildings and structures
 1120
 Autun Cathedral begun.
 Pagoda of Tianning Temple (天宁寺塔) in Beijing, China completed.
 c. 1120 – Abbey Church of Saint Foy in Conques, France completed.
 1121
 Hoysaleswara Temple of Halebidu, India (Hoysala Empire) completed.
 October 23 – Choir of Tewkesbury Abbey in England consecrated (begun in 1102).
 1123
 Sant Climent de Taüll, Catalonia consecrated.
 2nd reconstruction of Basilica di San Zeno in Verona, Italy, begins.
 Construction of the Château de Falaise in Normandy begins.
 1124 – Reconstruction of Santa Maria in Cosmedin, Rome, completed (begun in 1118).
 c. 1125–1130 – Round Church of the Holy Sepulchre, Cambridge, England, built.
 1127 – Rochester Castle, England begun.
 1128
 Florence Baptistry, Tuscany completed.
  Reconstruction of Angoulême Cathedral, France completed, largely as remaining in modern times.

Deaths
 1124 – March 15 – Ernulf, French-born Benedictine Bishop of Rochester and architect (b. c.1040)

12th-century architecture
1120s works